The MasterCard Lola Formula One Racing Team, often known as MasterCard Lola or simply Lola, was a British Formula One team that contested only one race in the 1997 Formula One World Championship. It quickly withdrew from the sport after failing to qualify on its debut at the 1997 Australian Grand Prix, where the cars were more than 11 seconds off the pace in qualifying.

Competition history
After years of providing chassis to other teams, mainly Larrousse, team principal Eric Broadley planned a team that would compete solely under Lola ownership.  A prototype chassis was first tested in 1995 with Allan McNish and in late 1996 Broadley announced the team's participation in the near future.  The team had originally intended to enter F1 in 1998, but entered a year early in 1997, Broadley saying that this was due to commercial pressures from the team's sponsors, primarily from title sponsor, MasterCard. This was due to MasterCard's ardour to launch its "F1 Club" for card holders to provide funding to Lola.

The Lola chassis, dubbed the T97/30, was based on most of their CART technology yet never saw the inside of a wind tunnel and barely had on-track tests. This was mainly because the design of the engine fell behind schedule.

Lola engine
The engine, the responsibility of Al Melling, was originally planned to be an in-house Lola V10, designed specifically to take into account the rear streamlining of the car and the underneath of the car in the area of the diffuser. However, the engine was not developed in time and Lola were compelled to use the Ford ECA Zetec-R V8 engine, the same specification V8 as used by the Forti team in the  season.

Drivers
Vincenzo Sospiri, an International Formula 3000 champion and Formula One test driver, and Ricardo Rosset were signed to drive. By the time the car made it to the 1997 Australian Grand Prix, the team's failings were laid bare, with the cars bottom of the qualifying timesheets by a considerable margin.  Under 1997 rules, drivers would only be allowed to start a race if they set a qualifying time within 107% of the pole position time or if under exceptional circumstances, they fail to qualify, their time in practice would be considered. At 11 and 13 seconds respectively, with the unintended Ford unit, Sospiri and Rosset were nowhere near achieving this. The cars were tested at Silverstone shortly after the Australian Grand Prix but both were again slowest with times in excess of 10 seconds off the front runners.

Withdrawal
On 26 March 1997, the Wednesday before the Brazilian Grand Prix, Lola announced it was withdrawing from the Brazil race due to "financial and technical problems". Lola's staff, who had already travelled to Interlagos, returned to the team's base in Huntingdon, England. Shortly afterwards, Lola withdrew from the World Championship outright.

In its short existence as a Formula One constructor, Lola had incurred £6 million in debt; the company went into receivership several weeks later. Irish entrepreneur Martin Birrane purchased the company and oversaw a revival in the company's fortunes; however, Lola has not been involved in Formula One in any capacity since. Rosset would go on to race for Tyrrell in 1998, but the promising Sospiri would never compete in Formula One again.

2010 comeback attempt
On 22 April 2009, Lola announced its intention to launch a full scale works effort for the 2010 FIA Formula One World Championship. The team said that they had to re-examine their position after the plans to introduce a budget cap of £30million were raised to £40m but insisted it was "an opportunity not to be missed". However, on 17 June, Lola announced it had abandoned the plan after failing to secure a place on the initial 2010 entry list.

Complete Formula One results
(key)

Notes

Formula One constructors
Formula One entrants
British auto racing teams
British racecar constructors

de:Lola Cars#1997